Jorik van Egdom (born 16 May 1995) is a Dutch triathlete. He competed in the mixed relay event at the 2020 Summer Olympics.

References

External links
 

1995 births
Living people
Dutch male triathletes
Olympic triathletes of the Netherlands
Triathletes at the 2020 Summer Olympics
People from Veenendaal
Sportspeople from Utrecht (province)
21st-century Dutch people